Milesia nigra is a species of hoverfly in the family Syrphidae.

Distribution
Panama.

References

Insects described in 1939
Eristalinae
Diptera of North America